The 2018–19 season is U.S. Lecce's first season in Serie B since 2010 after their relegation from Serie A to Lega Pro at the end of the 2011–12 season. The club competes in Serie B and the Coppa Italia.[jago][seun]

Players
.
Players in italics left the club during the season.Players with a * joined the club during the season.

** Left the club (shirt no. 9) on loan in August 2019, but came back from loan in January 2019. 
*** from the Primavera team.

Out on loan

Competitions

Serie B

Results by round

Matches

Coppa Italia

References

U.S. Lecce seasons
Lecce